Enteng the Dragon is a 1988 Philippine comedy film directed by Romy Villaflor and written by Tony S. Mortel. It is a parody of the film Enter the Dragon.

Plot
The story revolves around \ Enteng (Dolphy) a vendor of a mobile food house in China Town. Enteng is known for his humor, and a journalist and star reporter named Rowena (Dang Cecilio) was interested to cover his story after her Editor-in-Chief saw him as worthy of human interest. Kuto (Vandolph), a young boy that he found sleeping in his food wagon, led him to the shrine of the monks, that sealed his destiny as a vigilante and hero.

Cast
Dolphy as Enteng
Vandolph as Kuto
Dang Cecilio as Rowena
Eddie Garcia as the Evil Leader
Monica Herrera as Christina
Monsour del Rosario
Rommel Valdez
Tsing Tong Tsai
Panchito
Babalu
Don Pepot
Che-Che Sta. Ana
Roy Aoyama
Ros Olgado
Ernie Ortega
Estrella Querubin

Production
The film was produced by the RVQ Productions, a production owned by Dolphy himself.

Release
The film was released on July 14, 1988.

Accolades

References

Further reading

External links

1988 films
1988 comedy films
Filipino-language films
Philippine comedy films